Carlo Evertz (born 1 August 1990 in Germany) is a professional football midfielder who plays for La Calamine in the Belgian Third Division.

References

Belgian footballers
1990 births
Living people
K.A.S. Eupen players
Sint-Truidense V.V. players
Belgian Pro League players
FC Wiltz 71 players

Association football midfielders
Sportspeople from Aachen